Reading Green Park railway station is a railway station under construction in Reading, Berkshire, England. The station is intended to serve the  Green Park business area and the Madejski Stadium, as well as the proposed Green Park Village residential development. It will be on the Reading to Basingstoke Line, south of Southcote Junction. The station, which has planning permission from Reading Borough Council and funding in place from the Government, was set to open in late 2020 but its completion was delayed by the coronavirus pandemic. Although it was subsequently planned to open the station during the summer of 2022, it is currently scheduled to open in early 2023.

The station will be served by stopping services operated by Great Western Railway between Reading and Basingstoke, with an expected frequency of two trains per hour in each direction. The station will have two 5-car long canopied platforms, which will be connected by a  bridge, with lifts and stairs at each end. The station will have an interchange with the existing Green Park Park and Ride bus system, together with a taxi rank, surface level car park and cycle parking.

History

Initial proposals
Plans were announced in July 2007 and approved by the Office of Rail Regulation in March 2009. Building was originally expected to begin in early 2009, and be completed in early 2010. However, by late November 2010 building had not begun. Submissions were made to extend the planning permission for the station, which were due to expire in late 2010 and early 2011.

It was reported that the extended applications for planning consent contain a clause which, if approved, would ensure the developer of Green Park Village pays a premium of £4.26 million to find an alternative developer for the station if work has not begun on it within two years.

On 27 October 2011 the owners of the business park, Prupim, announced that plans for the station had been suspended after a local housing development project had been scaled down.

Resubmitted proposals
On 3 December 2013, Reading Borough Council stated that it would re-submit planning proposals for the station in 2014. It was reported, on 9 July 2014, that a £17 million Government investment in road and rail projects in Berkshire will include a sum for the station, enabling building work to start in 2015–16. In November 2014 the total investment was cited as £21.4 million, and that the station would cost £6.4 million. In March 2015, this cost was revised to £8 million in planning submissions to Reading Borough Council. The first £6.4 million would be met by the local enterprise partnership and the remaining £1.6 million covered by Reading Borough Council. On 29 April 2015 the council's planning committee renewed planning permission for the station. 

The station was planned to open in 2018, which should have coincided with electrification of the Reading – Basingstoke Line and introduction of new or refurbished trains. However, the electrification of the line was then put back until after 2019, and as of December 2022 has not been commenced. The proposed service was discussed at a meeting of Reading Borough Council's strategic environment, planning and transport committee on 24 November 2015. Concern was expressed that delay to the electrification of the railway line between Southcote Junction and Basingstoke could adversely affect the proposed train service.

The station is planned to be built in four phases, with its facilities expanding as the business park and residential development are built. Each phase will be built only when there is the required funding or demand:

 Phase One will provide a station with two platforms, each long enough for a five-coach train, platform canopies and a footbridge. There will be an access road and shared cycle and footway to the station. The station will have two bus bays, a cycle hire hub and cycle parking with an unspecified number of spaces.

 Phase Two would add a separate footpath to segregate pedestrians from cyclists, as well as a rank for five taxis, and increase the number of bus bays from two to three.

 Phase Three would add another section of access road, increase the number of bus bays to six and add a ground-level car park with 103 spaces. If enough funds were forthcoming soon enough, the project could proceed straight from Phase One to Phase Three.

 Phase Four would add a 200-space four-storey car park and reduce the ground level car park to 42 spaces.

In July 2016 the Berkshire Local Transport Body (BLTB) awarded an additional £3m to the initial £6.4m contract for Green Park Station after a review concluded "a significant increase in the forecast passenger demand for the station in comparison to the calculations undertaken in 2013". The additional funding would be for additional shelters and improved ticketing facilities. The Department for Transport confirmed in July 2017 that Reading Green Park station would receive £2.3m towards a total project cost of £16.5m.

Construction
Construction started on the station in the Spring of 2019. The station was originally due for opening in May 2020, then brought forward to Summer 2019 and then set to open by the end of 2020, before being delayed by the coronavirus pandemic. In October 2020 it was reported to be due to open in the late summer of 2021 "at the earliest". In June 2021 Network Rail announced that the opening had been put back until April to June 2022. It is currently scheduled to open in early 2023.

By 8 August 2021, work on the station buildings and platforms were largely complete, and the new station bridge had been lifted into place. Following the completion of the building works, a four to six month commissioning period was expected to follow, in order for the station to receive authorisation to be entered into service.

Service

There are generally two such trains per hour in each direction on weekdays and Saturdays, and one train per hour on Sundays.

References

Sources

Proposed railway stations in England
Burghfield